This is a list of the bird species recorded in Panama. The avifauna of Panama included a total of 1021 species as of July 2022, according to Bird Checklists of the World (Avibase). Three species have been added from other sources. Of the 1021 species, 125 are rare or accidental and six have been introduced by humans. Seven are endemic.

This list is presented in the taxonomic sequence of the Check-list of North and Middle American Birds, 7th edition through the 63rd Supplement, published by the American Ornithological Society (AOS). Common and scientific names are also those of the Check-list, except that the common names of families are from the Clements taxonomy because the AOS list does not include them.

Unless otherwise noted, the species on this list are considered to occur regularly in Panama as permanent residents, summer or winter visitors, or migrants. The following tags have been used to highlight several categories of occurrence. The tags and notes of population status are from Bird Checklists of the World.

(A) Accidental - a species that rarely or accidentally occurs in Panama
(E) Endemic - a species endemic to Panama
(I) Introduced - a species introduced to Panama as a consequence, direct or indirect, of human actions

Screamers
Order: AnseriformesFamily: Anhimidae

The screamers are a small family of birds related to the ducks. They are large, bulky birds, with a small downy head, long legs, and large feet which are only partially webbed. They have large spurs on their wings which are used in fights over mates and in territorial disputes.

Northern screamer, Chauna chavaria (A)

Tinamous

Order: TinamiformesFamily: Tinamidae

The tinamous are one of the most ancient groups of birds. Although they look similar to other ground-dwelling birds like quail and grouse, they have no close relatives and are classified as a single family, Tinamidae, within their own order, the Tinamiformes. They are distantly related to the ratites (order Struthioniformes) which includes the rheas, emu, and kiwis.

 Highland tinamou, Nothocercus bonapartei
 Great tinamou, Tinamus major (near-threatened)
 Little tinamou, Crypturellus soui
 Choco tinamou, Crypturellus kerriae (vulnerable)

Ducks, geese, and waterfowl

Order: AnseriformesFamily: Anatidae

Anatidae includes the ducks and most duck-like waterfowl, such as geese and swans. These birds are adapted to an aquatic existence with webbed feet, flattened bills, and feathers that are excellent at shedding water due to an oily coating.

 White-faced whistling-duck, Dendrocygna viduata (A)
 Black-bellied whistling-duck, Dendrocygna autumnalis
 Fulvous whistling-duck, Dendrocygna bicolor (A)
 Comb duck, Sarkidiornis sylvicola
 Muscovy duck, Cairina moschata
 Blue-winged teal, Spatula discors
 Cinnamon teal, Spatula cyanoptera (A)
 Northern shoveler, Spatula clypeata (A)
 American wigeon, Mareca americana
 Mallard, Anas platyrhynchos (A)
 White-cheeked pintail, Anas bahamensis (A)
 Northern pintail, Anas acuta (A)
 Green-winged teal, Anas crecca (A)
 Ring-necked duck, Aythya collaris
 Lesser scaup, Aythya affinis
 Red-breasted merganser, Mergus serrator (A)
 Masked duck, Nomonyx dominicus

Guans, chachalacas, and curassows

Order: GalliformesFamily: Cracidae

The Cracidae are large birds, similar in general appearance to turkeys. The guans and curassows live in trees, but the smaller chachalacas are found in more open scrubby habitats. They are generally dull-plumaged, but the curassows and some guans have colorful facial ornaments.

 Gray-headed chachalaca, Ortalis cinereiceps
 Baudo guan, Penelope ortoni (A) (endangered)
 Crested guan, Penelope purpurascens
 Black guan, Chamaepetes unicolor
 Great curassow, Crax rubra (vulnerable)

New World quail
Order: GalliformesFamily: Odontophoridae

The New World quail are small, plump terrestrial birds only distantly related to the quails of the Old World, but named for their similar appearance and habits.

 Tawny-faced quail, Rhynchortyx cinctus
 Crested bobwhite, Colinus cristatus
 Marbled wood-quail, Odontophorus gujanensis (near-threatened)
 Black-eared wood-quail, Odontophorus melanotis
 Tacarcuna wood-quail, Odontophorus dialeucos (A) (vulnerable)
 Black-breasted wood-quail, Odontophorus leucolaemus
 Spotted wood-quail, Odontophorus guttatus

Grebes

Order: PodicipediformesFamily: Podicipedidae

Grebes are small to medium-large freshwater diving birds. They have lobed toes and are excellent swimmers and divers. However, they have their feet placed far back on the body, making them quite ungainly on land.

 Least grebe, Tachybaptus dominicus
 Pied-billed grebe, Podilymbus podiceps (A) (vulnerable)

Pigeons and doves

Order: ColumbiformesFamily: Columbidae

Pigeons and doves are stout-bodied birds with short necks and short slender bills with a fleshy cere.

 Rock pigeon, Columba livia (I)
 Pale-vented pigeon, Patagioenas cayennensis
 Scaled pigeon, Patagioenas speciosa
 White-crowned pigeon, Patagioenas leucocephala (near-threatened)
 Red-billed pigeon, Patagioenas flavirostris (A)
 Band-tailed pigeon, Patagioenas fasciata
 Plumbeous pigeon, Patagioenas plumbea
 Ruddy pigeon, Patagioenas subvinacea
 Short-billed pigeon, Patagioenas nigrirostris
 Dusky pigeon, Patagioenas goodsoni (A)
 Eurasian collared-dove, Streptopelia decaocto (I) (A)
 Inca dove, Columbina inca (A)
 Common ground dove, Columbina passerina
 Plain-breasted ground dove, Columbina minuta
 Ruddy ground dove, Columbina talpacoti
 Blue ground dove, Claravis pretiosa
 Maroon-chested ground dove, Paraclaravis mondetoura
 Ruddy quail-dove, Geotrygon montana
 Violaceous quail-dove, Geotrygon violacea
 Olive-backed quail-dove, Leptotrygon veraguensis
 White-tipped dove, Leptotila verreauxi
 Gray-chested dove, Leptotila cassinii
 Gray-headed dove, Leptotila plumbeiceps
 Buff-fronted quail-dove, Zentrygon costaricensis
 Purplish-backed quail-dove, Zentrygon lawrencii
 Chiriqui quail-dove, Zentrygon chiriquensis
 Russet-crowned quail-dove, Zentrygon goldmani (near-threatened)
 White-winged dove, Zenaida asiatica
 Eared dove, Zenaida auriculata (A)
 Mourning dove, Zenaida macroura

Cuckoos

Order: CuculiformesFamily: Cuculidae

The family Cuculidae includes cuckoos, roadrunners, and anis. These birds are of variable size with slender bodies, long tails, and strong legs. The Old World cuckoos are brood parasites.

 Greater ani, Crotophaga major
 Smooth-billed ani, Crotophaga ani
 Groove-billed ani, Crotophaga sulcirostris
 Striped cuckoo, Tapera naevia
 Pheasant cuckoo, Dromococcyx phasianellus
 Rufous-vented ground-cuckoo, Neomorphus geoffroyi
 Little cuckoo, Coccycua minuta
 Dwarf cuckoo, Coccycua pumila (A)
 Squirrel cuckoo, Piaya cayana
 Dark-billed cuckoo, Coccyzus melacoryphus (A)
 Yellow-billed cuckoo, Coccyzus americanus
 Pearly-breasted cuckoo, Coccyzus euleri
 Mangrove cuckoo, Coccyzus minor
 Black-billed cuckoo, Coccyzus erythropthalmus
 Gray-capped cuckoo, Coccyzus lansbergi (A)

Nightjars and allies

Order: CaprimulgiformesFamily: Caprimulgidae

Nightjars are medium-sized nocturnal birds that usually nest on the ground. They have long wings, short legs, and very short bills. Most have small feet, of little use for walking, and long pointed wings. Their soft plumage is camouflaged to resemble bark or leaves.

 Short-tailed nighthawk, Lurocalis semitorquatus
 Lesser nighthawk, Chordeiles acutipennis
 Common nighthawk, Chordeiles minor
 Common pauraque, Nyctidromus albicollis
 Ocellated poorwill, Nyctiphrynus ocellatus (A)
 Chuck-will's-widow, Antrostomus carolinensis (near-threatened)
 Rufous nightjar, Antrostomus rufus
 Eastern whip-poor-will, Antrostomus vociferus (A) (near-threatened)
 Dusky nightjar, Antrostomus saturatus
 White-tailed nightjar, Hydropsalis cayennensis

Oilbird
Order: SteatornithiformesFamily: Steatornithidae

The oilbird is a slim, long-winged bird distantly related to the nightjars. It is nocturnal and a specialist feeder on the fruit of the oil palm.

 Oilbird, Steatornis caripensis (A)

Potoos
Order: NyctibiiformesFamily: Nyctibiidae

The potoos (sometimes called poor-me-ones) are large near passerine birds related to the nightjars and frogmouths. They are nocturnal insectivores which lack the bristles around the mouth found in the true nightjars.

 Great potoo, Nyctibius grandis
 Common potoo, Nyctibius griseus

Swifts
Order: ApodiformesFamily: Apodidae

Swifts are small birds which spend the majority of their lives flying. These birds have very short legs and never settle voluntarily on the ground, perching instead only on vertical surfaces. Many swifts have long swept-back wings which resemble a crescent or boomerang.

 Black swift, Cypseloides niger (A) (vulnerable)
 White-chinned swift, Cypseloides cryptus (A)
 Spot-fronted swift, Cypseloides cherriei (A) (population data deficient)
 Chestnut-collared swift, Streptoprocne rutila
 White-collared swift, Streptoprocne zonaris
 Gray-rumped swift, Chaetura cinereiventris
 Band-rumped swift, Chaetura spinicaudus
 Costa Rican swift, Chaetura fumosa (A)
 Chimney swift, Chaetura pelagica (vulnerable)
 Vaux's swift, Chaetura vauxi
 Chapman's swift, Chaetura chapmani (A)
 Sick's swift, Chaetura meridionalis (A)
 Short-tailed swift, Chaetura brachyura
 Lesser swallow-tailed swift, Panyptila cayennensis

Hummingbirds
Order: ApodiformesFamily: Trochilidae

Hummingbirds are small birds capable of hovering in mid-air due to the rapid flapping of their wings. They are the only birds that can fly backwards.

 White-necked jacobin, Florisuga mellivora
 White-tipped sicklebill, Eutoxeres aquila
 Bronzy hermit, Glaucis aeneus
 Rufous-breasted hermit, Glaucis hirsutus
 Band-tailed barbthroat, Threnetes ruckeri
 White-whiskered hermit, Phaethornis yaruqui (A) (not on the AOS Check-list)
 Green hermit, Phaethornis guy
 Long-billed hermit, Phaethornis longirostris
 Pale-bellied hermit, Phaethornis anthophilus
 Stripe-throated hermit, Phaethornis striigularis
 Green-fronted lancebill, Doryfera ludovicae
 Brown violetear, Colibri delphinae
 Lesser violetear, Colibri cyanotus
 Tooth-billed hummingbird, Androdon aequatorialis
 Purple-crowned fairy, Heliothryx barroti
 Ruby-topaz hummingbird, Chrysolampis mosquitus (A)
 Green-breasted mango, Anthracothorax prevostii
 Black-throated mango, Anthracothorax nigricollis
 Veraguan mango, Anthracothorax veraguensis
 Green thorntail, Discosura conversii
 Rufous-crested coquette, Lophornis delattrei
 White-crested coquette, Lophornis adorabilis
 Greenish puffleg, Haplophaedia aureliae
 Green-crowned brilliant, Heliodoxa jacula
 Talamanca hummingbird, Eugenes spectabilis
 Fiery-throated hummingbird, Panterpe insignis
 Long-billed starthroat, Heliomaster longirostris
 Plain-capped starthroat, Heliomaster constantii (A)
 White-bellied mountain-gem, Lampornis hemileucus
 Purple-throated mountain-gem, Lampornis calolaemus
 White-throated mountain-gem, Lampornis castaneoventris
 Magenta-throated woodstar, Philodice bryantae
 Purple-throated woodstar, Philodice mitchellii
 Ruby-throated hummingbird, Archilochus colubris (A)
 Volcano hummingbird, Selasphorus flammula
 Scintillant hummingbird, Selasphorus scintilla
 Glow-throated hummingbird, Selasphorus ardens (E) (endangered)
 Garden emerald, Chlorostilbon assimilis
 Violet-headed hummingbird, Klais guimeti
 Violet sabrewing, Campylopterus hemileucurus
 Bronze-tailed plumeleteer, Chalybura urochrysia
 White-vented plumeleteer, Chalybura buffonii
 Crowned woodnymph, Thalurania colombica
 Snowcap, Microchera albocoronata
 White-tailed emerald, Microchera chionura
 Violet-capped hummingbird, Goldmania violiceps
 Pirre hummingbird, Goldmania bella (near-threatened)
 Stripe-tailed hummingbird, Eupherusa eximia
 Black-bellied hummingbird, Eupherusa nigriventris
 Scaly-breasted hummingbird, Phaeochroa cuvierii
 Snowy-bellied hummingbird, Saucerottia edward
 Rufous-tailed hummingbird, Amazilia tzacatl
 Amazilia hummingbird, Amazilis amazilia (A)
 Sapphire-throated hummingbird, Chrysuronia coeruleogularis
 Humboldt's sapphire, Chrysuronia humboldtii (A)
 Blue-chested hummingbird, Polyerata amabilis
 Charming hummingbird, Polyerata decora
 Blue-throated goldentail, Chlorestes eliciae
 Violet-bellied hummingbird, Chlorestes julie

Rails, gallinules, and coots

Order: GruiformesFamily: Rallidae

Rallidae is a large family of small to medium-sized birds which includes the rails, crakes, coots, and gallinules. Typically they inhabit dense vegetation in damp environments near lakes, swamps, or rivers. In general they are shy and secretive birds, making them difficult to observe. Most species have strong legs and long toes which are well adapted to soft uneven surfaces. They tend to have short, rounded wings and to be weak fliers.

 Colombian crake, Mustelirallus colombianus (A) (population data deficient)
 Paint-billed crake, Mustelirallus erythrops
 Spotted rail, Pardirallus maculatus
 Uniform crake, Amaurolimnas concolor
 Rufous-necked wood-rail, Aramides axillaris (A)
 Gray-cowled wood-rail, Aramides cajaneus
 King rail, Rallus elegans (A) (near-threatened)
 Sora, Porzana carolina
 Common gallinule, Gallinula galeata
 American coot, Fulica americana
 Purple gallinule, Porphyrio martinicus
 Yellow-breasted crake, Hapalocrex flaviventer
 Ruddy crake, Laterallus ruber (A)
 White-throated crake, Laterallus albigularis
 Gray-breasted crake, Laterallus exilis
 Black rail, Laterallus jamaicensis (A)

Finfoots
Order: GruiformesFamily: Heliornithidae

Heliornithidae is a small family of tropical birds with webbed lobes on their feet similar to those of grebes and coots.

 Sungrebe, Heliornis fulica

Limpkin
Order: GruiformesFamily: Aramidae

The limpkin resembles a large rail. It has drab-brown plumage and a grayer head and neck.
 Limpkin, Aramus guarauna

Thick-knees
Order: CharadriiformesFamily: Burhinidae

The thick-knees are a group of largely tropical waders in the family Burhinidae. They are found worldwide within the tropical zone, with some species also breeding in temperate Europe and Australia. They are medium to large waders with strong black or yellow-black bills, large yellow eyes, and cryptic plumage. Despite being classed as waders, most species have a preference for arid or semi-arid habitats.

 Double-striped thick-knee, Burhinus bistriatus (A)

Stilts and avocets
Order: CharadriiformesFamily: Recurvirostridae

Recurvirostridae is a family of large wading birds which includes the avocets and stilts. The avocets have long legs and long up-curved bills. The stilts have extremely long legs and long, thin, straight bills.

 Black-necked stilt, Himantopus mexicanus
 American avocet, Recurvirostra americana (A)

Oystercatchers
Order: CharadriiformesFamily: Haematopodidae

The oystercatchers are large and noisy plover-like birds, with strong bills used for smashing or prising open molluscs.

 American oystercatcher, Haematopus palliatus

Plovers and lapwings

Order: CharadriiformesFamily: Charadriidae

The family Charadriidae includes the plovers, dotterels, and lapwings. They are small to medium-sized birds with compact bodies, short, thick necks, and long, usually pointed, wings. They are found in open country worldwide, mostly in habitats near water.

 Southern lapwing, Vanellus chilensis
 Black-bellied plover, Pluvialis squatarola
 American golden-plover, Pluvialis dominica
 Killdeer, Charadrius vociferus
 Semipalmated plover, Charadrius semipalmatus
 Wilson's plover, Charadrius wilsonia
 Collared plover, Charadrius collaris
 Snowy plover, Charadrius nivosus (A) (near-threatened)

Jacanas

Order: CharadriiformesFamily: Jacanidae

The jacanas are a group of waders which are found throughout the tropics. They are identifiable by their huge feet and claws which enable them to walk on floating vegetation in the shallow lakes that are their preferred habitat.

 Northern jacana, Jacana spinosa
 Wattled jacana, Jacana jacana

Sandpipers and allies
Order: CharadriiformesFamily: Scolopacidae

Scolopacidae is a large diverse family of small to medium-sized shorebirds including the sandpipers, curlews, godwits, shanks, tattlers, woodcocks, snipes, dowitchers, and phalaropes. The majority of these species eat small invertebrates picked out of the mud or soil. Variation in length of legs and bills enables multiple species to feed in the same habitat, particularly on the coast, without direct competition for food.

 Upland sandpiper, Bartramia longicauda
 Whimbrel, Numenius phaeopus
 Long-billed curlew, Numenius americanus (A)
 Hudsonian godwit, Limosa haemastica (A)
 Marbled godwit, Limosa fedoa
 Ruddy turnstone, Arenaria interpres
 Red knot, Calidris canutus (near-threatened)
 Surfbird, Calidris virgata
 Ruff, Calidris pugnax (A)
 Sharp-tailed sandpiper, Calidris acuminata (A)
 Stilt sandpiper, Calidris himantopus
 Curlew sandpiper, Calidris ferruginea (A) (near-threatened)
 Sanderling, Calidris alba
 Dunlin, Calidris alpina (A)
 Baird's sandpiper, Calidris bairdii
 Least sandpiper, Calidris minutilla
 White-rumped sandpiper, Calidris fuscicollis
 Buff-breasted sandpiper, Calidris subruficollis (near-threatened)
 Pectoral sandpiper, Calidris melanotos
 Semipalmated sandpiper, Calidris pusilla (near-threatened)
 Western sandpiper, Calidris mauri
 Short-billed dowitcher, Limnodromus griseus
 Long-billed dowitcher, Limnodromus scolopaceus
 Wilson's snipe, Gallinago delicata
 Spotted sandpiper, Actitis macularius
 Solitary sandpiper, Tringa solitaria
 Wandering tattler, Tringa incana (A)
 Lesser yellowlegs, Tringa flavipes
 Willet, Tringa semipalmata
 Greater yellowlegs, Tringa melanoleuca
 Wilson's phalarope, Phalaropus tricolor
 Red-necked phalarope, Phalaropus lobatus
 Red phalarope, Phalaropus fulicarius (A)

Skuas and jaegers
Order: CharadriiformesFamily: Stercorariidae

The family Stercorariidae are, in general, medium to large birds, typically with gray or brown plumage, often with white markings on the wings. They nest on the ground in temperate and arctic regions and are long-distance migrants.

 South polar skua, Stercorarius maccormicki (A)
 Pomarine jaeger, Stercorarius pomarinus
 Parasitic jaeger, Stercorarius parasiticus
 Long-tailed jaeger, Stercorarius longicaudus (A)

Gulls, terns, and skimmers

Order: CharadriiformesFamily: Laridae

Laridae is a family of medium to large seabirds and includes gulls, kittiwakes, terns, and skimmers. They are typically gray or white, often with black markings on the head or wings. They have longish bills and webbed feet. Terns are a group of generally medium to large seabirds typically with gray or white plumage, often with black markings on the head. Most terns hunt fish by diving but some pick insects off the surface of fresh water. Terns are generally long-lived birds, with several species known to live in excess of 30 years. Skimmers are a small family of tropical tern-like birds. They have an elongated lower mandible which they use to feed by flying low over the water surface and skimming the water for small fish.

 Swallow-tailed gull, Creagrus furcatus (A)
 Black-legged kittiwake, Rissa tridactyla (A)
 Sabine's gull, Xema sabini
 Bonaparte's gull, Chroicocephalus philadelphia (A)
 Gray-hooded gull, Chroicocephalus cirrocephalus (A)
 Gray gull, Leucophaeus modestus (A)
 Laughing gull, Leucophaeus atricilla
 Franklin's gull, Leucophaeus pipixcan
 Belcher's gull, Larus belcheri (A)
 Ring-billed gull, Larus delawarensis
 Western gull, Larus occidentalis (A)
 California gull, Larus californicus (A)
 Herring gull, Larus argentatus
 Lesser black-backed gull, Larus fuscus (A)
 Kelp gull, Larus dominicanus (A)
 Brown noddy, Anous stolidus
 Black noddy, Anous minutus (A)
 White tern, Gygis alba (A)
 Sooty tern, Onychoprion fuscatus
 Bridled tern, Onychoprion anaethetus
 Least tern, Sternula antillarum
 Yellow-billed tern, Sternula superciliaris (A)
 Large-billed tern, Phaetusa simplex (A)
 Gull-billed tern, Gelochelidon nilotica
 Caspian tern, Hydroprogne caspia
 Inca tern, Larosterna inca (A) (near-threatened)
 Black tern, Chlidonias niger
 Common tern, Sterna hirundo
 Arctic tern, Sterna paradisaea (A)
 Forster's tern, Sterna forsteri (A)
 Royal tern, Thalasseus maxima
 Sandwich tern, Thalasseus sandvicensis
 Elegant tern, Thalasseus elegans (near-threatened)
 Black skimmer, Rynchops niger (A)

Sunbittern
Order: EurypygiformesFamily: Eurypygidae

The sunbittern is a bittern-like bird of tropical regions of the Americas and the sole member of the family Eurypygidae (sometimes spelled Eurypigidae) and genus Eurypyga.

 Sunbittern, Eurypyga helias

Tropicbirds

Order: PhaethontiformesFamily: Phaethontidae

Tropicbirds are slender white birds of tropical oceans which have exceptionally long central tail feathers. Their heads and long wings have black markings.

 White-tailed tropicbird, Phaethon lepturus (A)
 Red-billed tropicbird, Phaethon aethereus

Penguins
Order: SphenisciformesFamily: Spheniscidae

The penguins are a group of aquatic, flightless birds living almost exclusively in the Southern Hemisphere. Most penguins feed on krill, fish, squid, and other forms of sealife caught while swimming underwater.

Galapagos penguin, Spheniscus mendiculus (A)

Albatrosses
Order: ProcellariiformesFamily: Diomedeidae

The albatrosses are among the largest of flying birds, and the great albatrosses from the genus Diomedea have the largest wingspans of any extant birds.

 Yellow-nosed albatross, Thalassarche chlororhynchos (A)
 Gray-headed albatross, Thalassarche chrysostoma (A)  (endangered)
 Black-browed albatross, Thalassarche melanophris (A)
 Wandering albatross, Diomedea exulans (A)
 Waved albatross, Phoebastria irrorata (A) (critically endangered)

Southern storm-petrels
Order: ProcellariiformesFamily: Oceanitidae

The storm-petrels are the smallest seabirds, relatives of the petrels, feeding on planktonic crustaceans and small fish picked from the surface, typically while hovering. The flight is fluttering and sometimes bat-like. Until 2018, this family's three species were included with the other storm-petrels in family Hydrobatidae.

 Wilson's storm-petrel, Oceanites oceanicus (A)
 Elliot's storm-petrel, Oceanites gracilis (A)

Northern storm-petrels
Order: ProcellariiformesFamily: Hydrobatidae

Though the members of this family are similar in many respects to the southern storm-petrels, including their general appearance and habits, there are enough genetic differences to warrant their placement in a separate family.

 Leach's storm-petrel, Hydrobates leucorhous (A) (vulnerable)
 Band-rumped storm-petrel, Hydrobates castro (A)
 Wedge-rumped storm-petrel, Hydrobates tethys
 Black storm-petrel, Hydrobates melania
 Markham's storm-petrel, Hydrobates markhami (A) (near-threatened)
 Least storm-petrel, Hydrobates microsoma

Shearwaters and petrels

Order: ProcellariiformesFamily: Procellariidae

The procellariids are the main group of medium-sized "true petrels", characterized by united nostrils with medium septum and a long outer functional primary.

 Black-capped petrel, Pterodroma hasitata (A)
 Galapagos petrel, Pterodroma phaeopygia (A) (critically endangered)
 Tahiti petrel, Pseudobulweria rostrata (A) (near-threatened)
 Parkinson's petrel, Procellaria parkinsoni (vulnerable)
 Cory's shearwater, Calonectris diomedea (A)
 Wedge-tailed shearwater, Ardenna pacificus (A)
 Sooty shearwater, Ardenna griseus (near-threatened)
 Pink-footed shearwater, Ardenna creatopus (A)
 Christmas shearwater, Puffinus navitatis (A)
 Galapagos shearwater, Puffinus subalaris
 Manx shearwater, Puffinus puffinus (A)
 Townsend's shearwater, Puffinus auricularis (A) (critically endangered)
 Newell's shearwater, Puffinus newelli (A) (critically endangered)
 Audubon's shearwater, Puffinus lherminieri
 Barolo shearwater, Puffinus baroli (A)

Storks
Order: CiconiiformesFamily: Ciconiidae

Storks are large, long-legged, long-necked wading birds with long stout bills. Storks are mute, but bill-clattering is an important mode of communication at the nest. Their nests can be large and may be reused for many years. Many species are migratory.

 Maguari stork, Ciconia maguari (A)
 Jabiru, Jabiru mycteria (A)
 Wood stork, Mycteria americana

Frigatebirds

Order: SuliformesFamily: Fregatidae

Frigatebirds are large seabirds usually found over tropical oceans. They are large, black-and-white, or completely black, with long wings and deeply forked tails. The males have colored inflatable throat pouches. They do not swim or walk and cannot take off from a flat surface. Having the largest wingspan-to-body-weight ratio of any bird, they are essentially aerial, able to stay aloft for more than a week.

 Magnificent frigatebird, Fregata magnificens
 Great frigatebird, Fregata minor (A)

Boobies and gannets

Order: SuliformesFamily: Sulidae

The sulids comprise the gannets and boobies. Both groups are medium to large coastal seabirds that plunge-dive for fish.

 Masked booby, Sula dactylatra
 Nazca booby, Sula granti (A)
 Blue-footed booby, Sula nebouxii
 Peruvian booby, Sula variegata
 Brown booby, Sula leucogaster
 Red-footed booby, Sula sula

Anhingas
Order: SuliformesFamily: Anhingidae

Anhingas are often called "snake-birds" because of their long thin neck, which gives a snake-like appearance when they swim with their bodies submerged. The males have black and dark-brown plumage, an erectile crest on the nape, and a larger bill than the female. The females have much paler plumage especially on the neck and underparts. The anhingas have completely webbed feet and their legs are short and set far back on the body. Their plumage is somewhat permeable, like that of cormorants, and they spread their wings to dry after diving.

 Anhinga, Anhinga anhinga

Cormorants and shags

Order: SuliformesFamily: Phalacrocoracidae

Phalacrocoracidae is a family of medium to large coastal, fish-eating seabirds that includes cormorants and shags. Plumage coloration varies, with the majority having mainly dark plumage, some species being black-and-white, and a few being colorful.

 Neotropic cormorant, Nannopterum brasilianum
 Guanay cormorant, Leucocarbo bougainvillii (A)

Pelicans

Order: PelecaniformesFamily: Pelecanidae

Pelicans are large water birds with a distinctive pouch under their beak. As with other members of the order Pelecaniformes, they have webbed feet with four toes.

 American white pelican, Pelecanus erythrorhynchos (A)
 Brown pelican, Pelecanus occidentalis

Herons, egrets, and bitterns

Order: PelecaniformesFamily: Ardeidae

The family Ardeidae contains the bitterns, herons, and egrets. Herons and egrets are medium to large wading birds with long necks and legs. Bitterns tend to be shorter-necked and more wary. Members of Ardeidae fly with their necks retracted, unlike other long-necked birds such as storks, ibises, and spoonbills.

 Pinnated bittern, Botaurus pinnatus (A)
 American bittern, Botaurus lentiginosus (A)
 Least bittern, Ixobrychus exilis
 Rufescent tiger-heron, Tigrisoma lineatum
 Fasciated tiger-heron, Tigrisoma fasciatum
 Bare-throated tiger-heron, Tigrisoma mexicanum
 Great blue heron, Ardea herodias
 Cocoi heron, Ardea cocoi
 Great egret, Ardea alba
 Whistling heron, Syrigma sibilatrix (A)
 Snowy egret, Egretta thula
 Little blue heron, Egretta caerulea
 Tricolored heron, Egretta tricolor
 Reddish egret, Egretta rufescens (A) (near-threatened)
 Cattle egret, Bubulcus ibis
 Green heron, Butorides virescens
 Striated heron, Butorides striata
 Agami heron, Agamia agami (vulnerable)
 Capped heron, Pilherodius pileatus
 Black-crowned night-heron, Nycticorax nycticorax
 Yellow-crowned night-heron, Nyctanassa violacea
 Boat-billed heron, Cochlearius cochlearius

Ibises and spoonbills

Order: PelecaniformesFamily: Threskiornithidae

Threskiornithidae is a family of large terrestrial and wading birds which includes the ibises and spoonbills. They have long, broad wings with 11 primary and about 20 secondary feathers. They are strong fliers and, despite their size and weight, very capable soarers.

 White ibis, Eudocimus albus
 Scarlet ibis, Eudocimus ruber (A)
 Glossy ibis, Plegadis falcinellus (A)
 White-faced ibis, Plegadis chihi (A)
 Green ibis, Mesembrinibis cayennensis
 Buff-necked ibis, Theristicus caudatus (A)
 Bare-faced ibis, Phimosus infuscatus (A)
 Roseate spoonbill, Platalea ajaja

New World vultures

Order: CathartiformesFamily: Cathartidae

The New World vultures are not closely related to Old World vultures, but superficially resemble them because of convergent evolution. Like the Old World vultures, they are scavengers. However, unlike Old World vultures, which find carcasses by sight, New World vultures have a good sense of smell with which they locate carrion.

 King vulture, Sarcoramphus papa
 Black vulture, Coragyps atratus
 Turkey vulture, Cathartes aura
 Lesser yellow-headed vulture, Cathartes burrovianus

Osprey
Order: AccipitriformesFamily: Pandionidae

The family Pandionidae contains only one species, the osprey. The osprey is a medium-large raptor which is a specialist fish-eater with a worldwide distribution.

 Osprey, Pandion haliaetus

Hawks, eagles, and kites
Order: AccipitriformesFamily: Accipitridae

Accipitridae is a family of birds of prey, which includes hawks, eagles, kites, harriers, and Old World vultures. These birds have powerful hooked beaks for tearing flesh from their prey, strong legs, powerful talons, and keen eyesight.

 Pearl kite, Gampsonyx swainsonii (A)
 White-tailed kite, Elanus leucurus
 Hook-billed kite, Chondrohierax uncinatus
 Gray-headed kite, Leptodon cayanensis
 Swallow-tailed kite, Elanoides forficatus
 Crested eagle, Morphnus guianensis (near-threatened)
 Harpy eagle, Harpia harpyja (near-threatened)
 Black hawk-eagle, Spizaetus tyrannus
 Black-and-white hawk-eagle, Spizaetus melanoleucus
 Ornate hawk-eagle, Spizaetus ornatus (near-threatened)
 Double-toothed kite, Harpagus bidentatus
 Northern harrier, Circus hudsonius
 Long-winged harrier, Circus buffoni (A)
 Gray-bellied hawk, Accipiter poliogaster (A) (near-threatened)
 Tiny hawk, Accipiter superciliosus
 Sharp-shinned hawk, Accipiter striatus
 Cooper's hawk, Accipiter cooperii (A)
 Bicolored hawk, Accipiter bicolor
 Mississippi kite, Ictinia mississippiensis
 Plumbeous kite, Ictinia plumbea
 Black-collared hawk, Busarellus nigricollis
 Crane hawk, Geranospiza caerulescens
 Snail kite, Rostrhamus sociabilis
 Slender-billed kite, Helicolestes hamatus (A)
 Plumbeous hawk, Cryptoleucopteryx plumbea (vulnerable)
 Common black hawk, Buteogallus anthracinus
 Savanna hawk, Buteogallus meridionalis
 Great black hawk, Buteogallus urubitinga
 Solitary eagle, Buteogallus solitarius (near-threatened)
 Barred hawk, Morphnarchus princeps
 Roadside hawk, Rupornis magnirostris
 Harris's hawk, Parabuteo unicinctus (A)
 White-tailed hawk, Geranoaetus albicaudatus
 White hawk, Pseudastur albicollis
 Semiplumbeous hawk, Leucopternis semiplumbeus
 Gray hawk, Buteo plagiatus (A)
 Gray-lined hawk, Buteo nitidus
 Broad-winged hawk, Buteo platypterus
 Short-tailed hawk, Buteo brachyurus
 Swainson's hawk, Buteo swainsoni
 Zone-tailed hawk, Buteo albonotatus
 Red-tailed hawk, Buteo jamaicensis

Barn-owls
Order: StrigiformesFamily: Tytonidae

Barn-owls are medium to large owls with large heads and characteristic heart-shaped faces. They have long strong legs with powerful talons.

 Barn owl, Tyto alba

Owls

Order: StrigiformesFamily: Strigidae

The typical owls are small to large solitary nocturnal birds of prey. They have large forward-facing eyes and ears, a hawk-like beak, and a conspicuous circle of feathers around each eye called a facial disk.

 Bare-shanked screech-owl, Megascops clarkii
 Tropical screech-owl, Megascops choliba
 Middle-American screech-owl, Megascops guatemalae
 Choco screech-owl, Megascops centralis
 Crested owl, Lophostrix cristata
 Spectacled owl, Pulsatrix perspicillata
 Great horned owl, Bubo virginianus (A)
 Costa Rican pygmy-owl, Glaucidium costaricanum
 Central American pygmy-owl, Glaucidium griseiceps
 Ferruginous pygmy-owl, Glaucidium brasilianum
 Burrowing owl, Athene cunicularia (A)
 Mottled owl, Strix virgata
 Black-and-white owl, Strix nigrolineata
 Striped owl, Asio clamator
 Unspotted saw-whet owl, Aegolius ridgwayi (A)

Trogons
Order: TrogoniformesFamily: Trogonidae

The family Trogonidae includes trogons and quetzals. Found in tropical woodlands worldwide, they feed on insects and fruit, and their broad bills and weak legs reflect their diet and arboreal habits. Although their flight is fast, they are reluctant to fly any distance. Trogons have soft, often colorful, feathers with distinctive male and female plumages.

 Lattice-tailed trogon, Trogon clathratus
 Slaty-tailed trogon, Trogon massena
 Black-tailed trogon, Trogon melanurus
 White-tailed trogon, Trogon viridis
 Baird's trogon, Trogon bairdii (near-threatened)
 Gartered trogon, Trogon caligatus
 Black-throated trogon, Trogon rufus
 Collared trogon, Trogon collaris
 Golden-headed quetzal, Pharomachrus auriceps
 Resplendent quetzal, Pharomachrus mocinno (near-threatened)

Motmots
Order: CoraciiformesFamily: Momotidae

The motmots have colorful plumage and long, graduated tails which they display by waggling back and forth. In most of the species, the barbs near the ends of the two longest (central) tail feathers are weak and fall off, leaving a length of bare shaft and creating a racket-shaped tail.

 Tody motmot, Hylomanes momotula
 Lesson's motmot, Momotus lessonii
 Whooping motmot, Momotus subrufescens
 Rufous motmot, Baryphthengus martii
 Broad-billed motmot, Electron platyrhynchum

Kingfishers

Order: CoraciiformesFamily: Alcedinidae

Kingfishers are medium-sized birds with large heads, long, pointed bills, short legs, and stubby tails.

 Ringed kingfisher, Megaceryle torquatus
 Belted kingfisher, Megaceryle alcyon
 Amazon kingfisher, Chloroceryle amazona
 American pygmy kingfisher, Chloroceryle aenea
 Green kingfisher, Chloroceryle americana
 Green-and-rufous kingfisher, Chloroceryle inda

Puffbirds

Order: PiciformesFamily: Bucconidae

The puffbirds are related to the jacamars and have the same range, but lack the iridescent colors of that family. They are mainly brown, rufous, or gray, with large heads and flattened bills with hooked tips. The loose abundant plumage and short tails makes them look stout and puffy, giving rise to the English common name of the family.

 Barred puffbird, Nystalus radiatus
 Russet-throated puffbird, Hypnelus ruficollis (A)
 White-necked puffbird, Notharchus hyperrhynchus
 Black-breasted puffbird, Notharchus pectoralis
 Pied puffbird, Notharchus tectus
 White-whiskered puffbird, Malacoptila panamensis
 Lanceolated monklet, Micromonacha lanceolata
 Gray-cheeked nunlet, Nonnula frontalis
 White-fronted nunbird, Monasa morphoeus

Jacamars

Order: PiciformesFamily: Galbulidae

The jacamars are near passerine birds from tropical South America, with a range that extends up to Mexico. They feed on insects caught on the wing and are glossy, elegant birds with long bills and tails. They resemble the Old World bee-eaters, although they are more closely related to puffbirds.

 Dusky-backed jacamar, Brachygalba salmoni
 Rufous-tailed jacamar, Galbula ruficauda
 Great jacamar, Jacamerops aureus

New World barbets
Order: PiciformesFamily: Capitonidae

The barbets are plump birds, with short necks and large heads. They get their name from the bristles which fringe their heavy bills. Most species are brightly colored.

 Spot-crowned barbet, Capito maculicoronatus
 Red-headed barbet, Eubucco bourcierii

Toucan-barbets
Order: PiciformesFamily: Semnornithidae

The toucan-barbets are birds of montane forests in the Neotropics. They are highly social and non-migratory.

 Prong-billed barbet, Semnornis frantzii

Toucans

Order: PiciformesFamily: Ramphastidae

Toucans are near passerine birds from the Neotropics. They are brightly marked and have enormous, colorful bills which in some species amount to half their body length.

 Northern emerald-toucanet, Aulacorhynchus prasinus
 Collared aracari, Pteroglossus torquatus
 Fiery-billed aracari, Pteroglossus frantzii
 Yellow-eared toucanet, Selenidera spectabilis
 Keel-billed toucan, Ramphastos sulfuratus
 Choco toucan, Ramphastos brevis (A)
 Yellow-throated toucan, Ramphastos ambiguus (near-threatened)

Woodpeckers

Order: PiciformesFamily: Picidae

Woodpeckers are small to medium-sized birds with chisel-like beaks, short legs, stiff tails, and long tongues used for capturing insects. Some species have feet with two toes pointing forward and two backward, while several species have only three toes. Many woodpeckers have the habit of tapping noisily on tree trunks with their beaks.

 Olivaceous piculet, Picumnus olivaceus
 Acorn woodpecker, Melanerpes formicivorus
 Golden-naped woodpecker, Melanerpes chrysauchen
 Black-cheeked woodpecker, Melanerpes pucherani
 Red-crowned woodpecker, Melanerpes rubricapillus
 Hoffmann's woodpecker, Melanerpes hoffmannii (A)
 Yellow-bellied sapsucker, Sphyrapicus varius
 Hairy woodpecker, Dryobates villosus
 Smoky-brown woodpecker, Dryobates fumigatus
 Red-rumped woodpecker, Veniliornis kirkii
 Rufous-winged woodpecker, Piculus simplex
 Stripe-cheeked woodpecker, Piculus callopterus (E)
 Golden-green woodpecker, Piculus chrysochloros
 Golden-olive woodpecker, Piculus rubiginosus
 Spot-breasted woodpecker, Colaptes punctigula
 Cinnamon woodpecker, Celeus loricatus
 Chestnut-colored woodpecker, Celeus castaneus
 Lineated woodpecker, Dryocopus lineatus
 Crimson-bellied woodpecker, Campephilus haematogaster
 Crimson-crested woodpecker, Campephilus melanoleucos
 Pale-billed woodpecker, Campephilus guatemalensis

Falcons and caracaras

Order: FalconiformesFamily: Falconidae

Falconidae is a family of diurnal birds of prey. They differ from hawks, eagles, and kites in that they kill with their beaks instead of their talons.

 Laughing falcon, Herpetotheres cachinnans
 Barred forest-falcon, Micrastur ruficollis
 Slaty-backed forest-falcon, Micrastur mirandollei
 Collared forest-falcon, Micrastur semitorquatus
 Red-throated caracara, Ibycter americanus
 Crested caracara, Caracara plancus
 Yellow-headed caracara, Milvago chimachima
 American kestrel, Falco sparverius
 Merlin, Falco columbarius
 Aplomado falcon, Falco femoralis
 Bat falcon, Falco rufigularis
 Orange-breasted falcon, Falco deiroleucus (A) (near-threatened)
 Peregrine falcon, Falco peregrinus

New World and African parrots

Order: PsittaciformesFamily: Psittacidae

Parrots are small to large birds with a characteristic curved beak. Their upper mandibles have slight mobility in the joint with the skull and they have a generally erect stance. All parrots are zygodactyl, having the four toes on each foot placed two at the front and two to the back.

 Painted parakeet, Pyrrhura picta
 Sulphur-winged parakeet, Pyrrhura hoffmanni
 Olive-throated parakeet, Eupsittula nana
 Brown-throated parakeet, Eupsittula pertinax
 Blue-and-yellow macaw, Ara ararauna
 Chestnut-fronted macaw, Ara severus
 Scarlet macaw, Ara macao
 Red-and-green macaw, Ara chloropterus
 Great green macaw, Ara ambiguus (endangered)
 Crimson-fronted parakeet, Psittacara finschi
 Barred parakeet, Bolborhynchus lineola
 Spectacled parrotlet, Forpus conspicillatus
 Orange-chinned parakeet, Brotogeris jugularis
 Red-fronted parrotlet, Touit costaricensis (vulnerable)
 Blue-fronted parrotlet, Touit dilectissimus
 Brown-hooded parrot, Pyrilia haematotis
 Saffron-headed parrot, Pyrilia pyrilia (near-threatened)
 Blue-headed parrot, Pionus menstruus
 White-crowned parrot, Pionus senilis
 Red-lored parrot, Amazona autumnalis
 Mealy parrot, Amazona farinosa
 Yellow-crowned parrot, Amazona ochrocephala

Sapayoa
Order: PasseriformesFamily: Sapayoidae

The sapayoa is the only member of its family, and is found in the lowland rainforests of Panama and north-western South America. It is usually seen in pairs or mixed-species flocks.

 Sapayoa, Sapayoa aenigma

Manakins

Order: PasseriformesFamily: Pipridae

The manakins are a family of subtropical and tropical mainland Central and South America, and Trinidad and Tobago. They are compact forest birds, the males typically being brightly colored, although the females of most species are duller and usually green-plumaged. Manakins feed on small fruits, berries, and insects.

 Lance-tailed manakin, Chiroxiphia lanceolata
 White-ruffed manakin, Corapipo altera
 Green manakin, Cryptopipo holochlora
 Blue-crowned manakin, Lepidothrix coronata
 White-collared manakin, Manacus candei
 Orange-collared manakin, Manacus aurantiacus
 Golden-collared manakin, Manacus vitellinus
 White-crowned manakin, Pseudopipra pipra
 Red-capped manakin, Ceratopipra mentalis
 Golden-headed manakin, Ceratopipra erythrocephala

Cotingas

Order: PasseriformesFamily: Cotingidae

The cotingas are birds of forests or forest edges in tropical Central and South America. Comparatively little is known about this diverse group, although all have broad bills with hooked tips, rounded wings, and strong legs. The males of many of the species are brightly colored or decorated with plumes or wattles.

 Purple-throated fruitcrow, Querula purpurata
 Bare-necked umbrellabird, Cephalopterus glabricollis (endangered)
 Lovely cotinga, Cotinga amabilis (A)
 Turquoise cotinga, Cotinga ridgwayi (vulnerable)
 Blue cotinga, Cotinga nattererii
 Rufous piha, Lipaugus unirufus
 Three-wattled bellbird, Procnias tricarunculata (vulnerable)
 Black-tipped cotinga, Carpodectes hopkei
 Yellow-billed cotinga, Carpodectes antoniae (endangered)
 Snowy cotinga, Carpodectes nitidus

Tityras and allies
Order: PasseriformesFamily: Tityridae

Tityridae are suboscine passerine birds found in forest and woodland in the Neotropics. The species in this family were formerly spread over the families Tyrannidae, Pipridae, and Cotingidae. They are small to medium-sized birds. They do not have the sophisticated vocal capabilities of the songbirds. Most, but not all, have plain coloring.

 Northern schiffornis, Schiffornis veraepacis
 Russet-winged schiffornis, Schiffornis stenorhyncha
 Speckled mourner, Laniocera rufescens
 Masked tityra, Tityra semifasciata
 Black-crowned tityra, Tityra inquisitor
 Barred becard, Pachyramphus versicolor
 Cinereous becard, Pachyramphus rufus
 Cinnamon becard, Pachyramphus cinnamomeus
 White-winged becard, Pachyramphus polychopterus
 Black-and-white becard, Pachyramphus albogriseus
 Rose-throated becard, Pachyramphus aglaiae
 One-colored becard, Pachyramphus homochrousRoyal flycatcher and alliesOrder: PasseriformesFamily: Onychorhynchidae

The members of this small family, created in 2018, were formerly considered to be tyrant flycatchers, family Tyrannidae.

 Sharpbill, Oxyruncus cristatus
 Royal flycatcher, Onychorhynchus mexicanus
 Ruddy-tailed flycatcher, Terenotriccus erythrurus
 Tawny-breasted flycatcher, Myiobius villosus (A)
 Sulphur-rumped flycatcher, Myiobius sulphureipygius
 Black-tailed flycatcher, Myiobius atricaudus

Tyrant flycatchersOrder: PasseriformesFamily: Tyrannidae

Tyrant flycatchers are passerine birds which occur throughout North and South America. They superficially resemble the Old World flycatchers, but are more robust and have stronger bills. They do not have the sophisticated vocal capabilities of the songbirds. Most, but not all, have plain coloring. As the name implies, most are insectivorous.

 Gray-headed piprites, Piprites griseiceps (A)
 Stub-tailed spadebill, Platyrinchus cancrominus
 White-throated spadebill, Platyrinchus mystaceus
 Golden-crowned spadebill, Platyrinchus coronatus
 Olive-striped flycatcher, Mionectes olivaceus
 Ochre-bellied flycatcher, Mionectes oleagineus
 Sepia-capped flycatcher, Leptopogon amaurocephalus
 Slaty-capped flycatcher, Leptopogon superciliaris
 Yellow-green tyrannulet, Phylloscartes flavovirens (E)
 Rufous-browed tyrannulet, Phylloscartes superciliaris
 Bronze-olive pygmy-tyrant, Pseudotriccus pelzelni
 Black-capped pygmy-tyrant, Myiornis atricapillus
 Scale-crested pygmy-tyrant, Lophotriccus pileatus
 Pale-eyed pygmy-tyrant, Lophotriccus pilaris
 Northern bentbill, Oncostoma cinereigulare
 Southern bentbill, Oncostoma olivaceum
 Slate-headed tody-flycatcher, Poecilotriccus sylvia
 Common tody-flycatcher, Todirostrum cinereum
 Black-headed tody-flycatcher, Todirostrum nigriceps
 Brownish twistwing, Cnipodectes subbrunneus
 Eye-ringed flatbill, Rhynchocyclus brevirostris
 Olivaceous flatbill, Rhynchocyclus olivaceus
 Yellow-olive flycatcher, Tolmomyias sulphurescens
 Yellow-margined flycatcher, Tolmomyias assimilis
 Yellow-breasted flycatcher, Tolmomyias flaviventris
 Yellow-bellied tyrannulet, Ornithion semiflavum (A)
 Brown-capped tyrannulet, Ornithion brunneicapillus
 Southern beardless-tyrannulet, Camptostoma obsoletum
 Mouse-colored tyrannulet, Nesotriccus murinus
 Yellow tyrannulet, Capsiempis flaveola
 Yellow-crowned tyrannulet, Tyrannulus elatus
 Forest elaenia, Myiopagis gaimardii
 Gray elaenia, Myiopagis caniceps
 Greenish elaenia, Myiopagis viridicata
 Yellow-bellied elaenia, Elaenia flavogaster
 Lesser elaenia, Elaenia chiriquensis
 Mountain elaenia, Elaenia frantzii
 Torrent tyrannulet, Serpophaga cinerea
 Rough-legged tyrannulet, Phyllomyias burmeisteri
 Sooty-headed tyrannulet, Phyllomyias griseiceps
 Mistletoe tyrannulet, Zimmerius parvus
 Bright-rumped attila, Attila spadiceus
 Choco sirystes, Sirystes albogriseus
 Rufous mourner, Rhytipterna holerythra
 Dusky-capped flycatcher, Myiarchus tuberculifer
 Panama flycatcher, Myiarchus panamensis
 Great crested flycatcher, Myiarchus crinitus
 Lesser kiskadee, Pitangus lictor
 Great kiskadee, Pitangus sulphuratus
 Cattle tyrant, Machetornis rixosa (A)
 Boat-billed flycatcher, Megarynchus pitangua
 Rusty-margined flycatcher, Myiozetetes cayanensis
 Social flycatcher, Myiozetetes similis
 Gray-capped flycatcher, Myiozetetes granadensis
 White-ringed flycatcher, Conopias albovittatus
 Golden-bellied flycatcher, Myiodynastes hemichrysus
 Golden-crowned flycatcher, Myiodynastes chrysocephalus
 Streaked flycatcher, Myiodynastes maculatus
 Sulphur-bellied flycatcher, Myiodynastes luteiventris
 Piratic flycatcher, Legatus leucophaius
 Variegated flycatcher, Empidonomus varius (A)
 Crowned slaty flycatcher, Empidonomus aurantioatrocristatus (A)
 Tropical kingbird, Tyrannus melancholicus
 Cassin's kingbird, Tyrannus vociferans (A)
 Western kingbird, Tyrannus verticalis (A)
 Eastern kingbird, Tyrannus tyrannus
 Gray kingbird, Tyrannus dominicensis
 Scissor-tailed flycatcher, Tyrannus forficatus
 Fork-tailed flycatcher, Tyrannus savana
 Bran-colored flycatcher, Myiophobus fasciatus
 Black-billed flycatcher, Aphanotriccus audax (near-threatened)
 Tufted flycatcher, Mitrephanes phaeocercus
 Olive-sided flycatcher, Contopus cooperi (near-threatened)
 Dark pewee, Contopus lugubris
 Ochraceous pewee, Contopus ochraceus
 Western wood-pewee, Contopus sordidulus
 Eastern wood-pewee, Contopus virens
 Tropical pewee, Contopus cinereus
 Yellow-bellied flycatcher, Empidonax flaviventris
 Acadian flycatcher, Empidonax virescens
 Alder flycatcher, Empidonax alnorum
 Willow flycatcher, Empidonax traillii
 White-throated flycatcher, Empidonax albigularis
 Least flycatcher, Empidonax minimus (near-threatened)
 Hammond's flycatcher, Empidonax hammondii (A)
 Yellowish flycatcher, Empidonax flavescens
 Black-capped flycatcher, Empidonax atriceps
 Black phoebe, Sayornis nigricans
 Vermilion flycatcher, Pyrocephalus rubinus (A)
 Pied water-tyrant, Fluvicola pica
 Northern scrub-flycatcher, Sublegatus arenarum
 Long-tailed tyrant, Colonia colonus

GnateatersOrder: PasseriformesFamily: Conopophagidae

The members of this small family are found across northern South America and into Central America. They are forest birds, usually seen on the ground or in the low understory.

 Black-crowned antpitta, Pittasoma michleri

Typical antbirdsOrder: PasseriformesFamily: Thamnophilidae

The antbirds are a large family of small passerine birds of subtropical and tropical Central and South America. They are forest birds which tend to feed on insects at or near the ground. A sizable minority of them specialize in following columns of army ants to eat small invertebrates that leave their hiding places to flee from the ants. Many species lack bright color, with brown, black, and white being the dominant tones.

 Fasciated antshrike, Cymbilaimus lineatus
 Great antshrike, Taraba major
 Barred antshrike, Thamnophilus doliatus
 Black antshrike, Thamnophilus nigriceps
 Black-hooded antshrike, Thamnophilus bridgesi
 Black-crowned antshrike, Thamnophilus atrinucha
 Spiny-faced antshrike, Xenornis setifrons (vulnerable)
 Russet antshrike, Thamnistes anabatinus
 Plain antvireo, Dysithamnus mentalis
 Spot-crowned antvireo, Dysithamnus puncticeps
 Moustached antwren, Myrmotherula ignota
 Pacific antwren, Myrmotherula pacifica
 White-flanked antwren, Myrmotherula axillaris
 Slaty antwren, Myrmotherula schisticolor
 Checker-throated stipplethroat, Epinecrophylla fulviventris
 Rusty-winged antwren, Herpsilochmus frater
 Dot-winged antwren, Microrhopias quixensis
 White-fringed antwren, Formicivora grisea
 Rufous-rumped antwren, Euchrepomis callinota
 Dusky antbird, Cercomacroides tyrannina
 Jet antbird, Cercomacra nigricans
 Bare-crowned antbird, Gymnocichla nudiceps
 White-bellied antbird, Myrmeciza longipes
 Chestnut-backed antbird, Poliocrania exsul
 Dull-mantled antbird, Sipia laemosticta
 Zeledon's antbird, Hafferia zeledoni
 Spotted antbird, Hylophylax naevioides
 Wing-banded antbird, Myrmornis torquata
 Bicolored antbird, Gymnopithys leucaspis
 Ocellated antbird, Phaenostictus mcleannani

AntpittasOrder: PasseriformesFamily: Grallariidae

Antpittas resemble the true pittas with strong, longish legs, very short tails, and stout bills.

 Scaled antpitta, Grallaria guatimalensis
 Streak-chested antpitta, Hylopezus perspicillatus
 Thicket antpitta, Hylopezus dives
 Ochre-breasted antpitta, Grallaricula flavirostris (near-threatened)

TapaculosOrder: PasseriformesFamily: Rhinocryptidae

The tapaculos are small suboscine passeriform birds with numerous species in South and Central America. They are terrestrial species that fly only poorly on their short wings. They have strong legs, well-suited to their habitat of grassland or forest undergrowth. The tail is cocked and pointed towards the head.

 Tacarcuna tapaculo, Scytalopus panamensis (A) (vulnerable)
 Choco tapaculo, Scytalopus chocoensis
 Silvery-fronted tapaculo, Scytalopus argentifrons

AntthrushesOrder: PasseriformesFamily: Formicariidae

Antthrushes resemble small rails with strong, longish legs, very short tails, and stout bills.

 Black-faced antthrush, Formicarius analis
 Black-headed antthrush, Formicarius nigricapillus
 Rufous-breasted antthrush, Formicarius rufipectus

Ovenbirds and woodcreepersOrder: PasseriformesFamily: Furnariidae

Ovenbirds comprise a large family of small sub-oscine passerine bird species found in Central and South America. They are a diverse group of insectivores which gets its name from the elaborate "oven-like" clay nests built by some species, although others build stick nests or nest in tunnels or clefts in rock. The woodcreepers are brownish birds which maintain an upright vertical posture supported by their stiff tail vanes. They feed mainly on insects taken from tree trunks.

 Middle American leaftosser, Sclerurus mexicanus
 South American leaftosser, Sclerurus obscurior
 Gray-throated leaftosser, Sclerurus albigularis (near-threatened)
 Scaly-throated leaftosser, Sclerurus guatemalensis
 Olivaceous woodcreeper, Sittasomus griseicapillus
 Long-tailed woodcreeper, Deconychura longicauda (near-threatened)
 Ruddy woodcreeper, Dendrocincla homochroa
 Tawny-winged woodcreeper, Dendrocincla anabatina
 Plain-brown woodcreeper, Dendrocincla fuliginosa
 Wedge-billed woodcreeper, Glyphorynchus spirurus
 Northern barred-woodcreeper, Dendrocolaptes sanctithomae
 Black-banded woodcreeper, Dendrocolaptes picumnus
 Strong-billed woodcreeper, Xiphocolaptes promeropirhynchus
 Cocoa woodcreeper, Xiphorhynchus susurrans
 Black-striped woodcreeper, Xiphorhynchus lachrymosus
 Spotted woodcreeper, Xiphorhynchus erythropygius
 Straight-billed woodcreeper, Dendroplex picus
 Red-billed scythebill, Campylorhamphus trochilirostris
 Brown-billed scythebill, Campylorhamphus pusillus
 Streak-headed woodcreeper, Lepidocolaptes souleyetii
 Spot-crowned woodcreeper, Lepidocolaptes affinis
 Plain xenops, Xenops minutus
 Streaked xenops, Xenops rutilans
 Buffy tuftedcheek, Pseudocolaptes lawrencii
 Sharp-tailed streamcreeper, Lochmias nematura
 Slaty-winged foliage-gleaner, Philydor fuscipenne
 Buff-fronted foliage-gleaner, Dendroma rufa
 Scaly-throated foliage-gleaner, Anabacerthia variegaticeps
 Lineated foliage-gleaner, Syndactyla subalaris
 Ruddy foliage-gleaner, Clibanornis rubiginosus
 Streak-breasted treehunter, Thripadectes rufobrunneus
 Buff-throated foliage-gleaner, Automolus ochrolaemus
 Chiriqui foliage-gleaner, Automolus exsertus
 Striped woodhaunter, Automolus subulatus
 Spotted barbtail, Premnoplex brunnescens
 Beautiful treerunner, Margarornis bellulus (E) (near-threatened)
 Ruddy treerunner, Margarornis rubiginosus
 Double-banded graytail, Xenerpestes minlosi
 Red-faced spinetail, Cranioleuca erythrops
 Coiba spinetail, Cranioleuca dissita (E) (near-threatened)
 Pale-breasted spinetail, Synallaxis albescens
 Slaty spinetail, Synallaxis brachyura

Vireos, shrike-babblers, and erpornisOrder: PasseriformesFamily: Vireonidae

The vireos are a group of small to medium-sized passerine birds. They are typically greenish in color and resemble wood warblers apart from their heavier bills.

 Rufous-browed peppershrike, Cyclarhis gujanensis
 Scrub greenlet, Hylophilus flavipes
 Green shrike-vireo, Vireolanius pulchellus
 Yellow-browed shrike-vireo, Vireolanius eximius
 Tawny-crowned greenlet, Hylophilus ochraceiceps
 Lesser greenlet, Hylophilus decurtatus
 Golden-fronted greenlet, Hylophilus aurantiifrons
 White-eyed vireo, Vireo griseus (A)
 Yellow-throated vireo, Vireo flavifrons
 Yellow-winged vireo, Vireo carmioli
 Blue-headed vireo, Vireo solitarius (A)
 Philadelphia vireo, Vireo philadelphicus
 Warbling vireo, Vireo gilvus (A)
 Brown-capped vireo, Vireo leucophrys
 Red-eyed vireo, Vireo olivaceus
 Chivi vireo, Vireo chivi (A)
 Yellow-green vireo, Vireo flavoviridis
 Black-whiskered vireo, Vireo altiloquus (A)

Crows, jays, and magpiesOrder: PasseriformesFamily: Corvidae

The family Corvidae includes crows, ravens, jays, choughs, magpies, treepies, nutcrackers, and ground jays. Corvids are above average in size among the Passeriformes, and some of the larger species show high levels of intelligence.

 Silvery-throated jay, Cyanolyca argentigula
 Azure-hooded jay, Cyanolyca cucullata
 Brown jay, Psilorhinus morio
 Black-chested jay, Cyanocorax affinis

SwallowsOrder: PasseriformesFamily: Hirundinidae

The family Hirundinidae is adapted to aerial feeding. They have a slender streamlined body, long pointed wings, and a short bill with a wide gape. The feet are adapted to perching rather than walking, and the front toes are partially joined at the base.

 Bank swallow, Riparia riparia
 Tree swallow, Tachycineta bicolor (A)
 White-winged swallow, Tachycineta albiventer (A) (not on the AOS Check-list)
 Violet-green swallow, Tachycineta thalassina (A)
 Mangrove swallow, Tachycineta albilinea
 White-thighed swallow, Atticora tibialis
 Blue-and-white swallow, Pygochelidon cyanoleuca
 Northern rough-winged swallow, Stelgidopteryx serripennis
 Southern rough-winged swallow, Stelgidopteryx ruficollis
 Brown-chested martin, Progne tapera
 Purple martin, Progne subis
 Southern martin, Progne elegans (A)
 Gray-breasted martin, Progne chalybea
 Barn swallow, Hirundo rustica
 Cliff swallow, Petrochelidon pyrrhonota
 Cave swallow, Petrochelidon fulva (A)

WaxwingsOrder: PasseriformesFamily: Bombycillidae

The waxwings are a group of birds with soft silky plumage and unique red tips to some of the wing feathers. In the Bohemian and cedar waxwings, these tips look like sealing wax and give the group its name. These are arboreal birds of northern forests. They live on insects in summer and berries in winter.

 Cedar waxwing, Bombycilla cedrorum (A)

Silky-flycatchersOrder: PasseriformesFamily: Ptiliogonatidae

The silky-flycatchers are a small family of passerine birds which occur mainly in Central America, although the range of one species extends to central California. They are related to waxwings and like that group have soft silky plumage, usually gray or pale yellow. They have small crests.

 Black-and-yellow silky-flycatcher, Phainoptila melanoxantha
 Long-tailed silky-flycatcher, Ptiliogonys caudatus

GnatcatchersOrder: PasseriformesFamily: Polioptilidae

These dainty birds resemble Old World warblers in their build and habits, moving restlessly through the foliage seeking insects. The gnatcatchers and gnatwrens are mainly soft bluish gray in color and have the typical insectivore's long sharp bill. They are birds of fairly open woodland or scrub, which nest in bushes or trees.

 Long-billed gnatwren, Ramphocaenus melanurus
 Tawny-faced gnatwren, Microbates cinereiventris
 Slate-throated gnatcatcher, Polioptila schistaceigula
 White-browed gnatcatcher, Polioptila bilineata

WrensOrder: PasseriformesFamily: Troglodytidae

The wrens are mainly small and inconspicuous except for their loud songs. These birds have short wings and thin down-turned bills. Several species often hold their tails upright. All are insectivorous.

 Scaly-breasted wren, Microcerculus marginatus
 House wren, Troglodytes aedon
 Ochraceous wren, Troglodytes ochraceus
 Timberline wren, Thryorchilus browni
 Grass wren, Cistothorus platensis (A)
 White-headed wren, Campylorhynchus albobrunneus
 Band-backed wren, Campylorhynchus zonatus
 Bicolored wren, Campylorhynchus griseus (A)
 Sooty-headed wren, Pheugopedius spadix
 Black-throated wren, Pheugopedius atrogularis
 Rufous-breasted wren, Pheugopedius rutilus
 Black-bellied wren, Pheugopedius fasciatoventris
 Rufous-and-white wren, Thryophilus rufalbus
 Stripe-throated wren, Cantorchilus leucopogon
 Stripe-breasted wren, Cantorchilus thoracicus
 Canebrake wren, Cantorchilus zeledoni
 Isthmian wren, Cantorchilus elutus
 Bay wren, Cantorchilus nigricapillus
 Riverside wren, Cantorchilus semibadius
 Buff-breasted wren, Cantorchilus leucotis
 White-breasted wood-wren, Henicorhina leucosticta
 Gray-breasted wood-wren, Henicorhina leucophrys
 Song wren, Cyphorhinus phaeocephalus

Mockingbirds and thrashersOrder: PasseriformesFamily: Mimidae

The mimids are a family of passerine birds that includes thrashers, mockingbirds, tremblers, and the New World catbirds. These birds are notable for their vocalizations, especially their ability to mimic a wide variety of birds and other sounds heard outdoors. Their coloring tends towards dull-grays and browns.

 Gray catbird, Dumetella carolinensis
 Tropical mockingbird, Mimus gilvus

StarlingsOrder: PasseriformesFamily: Sturnidae

Starlings are small to medium-sized passerine birds. Their flight is strong and direct and they are very gregarious. Their preferred habitat is fairly open country. They eat insects and fruit. Plumage is typically dark with a metallic sheen.

 European starling, Sturnus vulgaris (I) (A)

DippersOrder: PasseriformesFamily: Cinclidae

Dippers are a group of perching birds whose habitat includes aquatic environments in the Americas, Europe, and Asia. They are named for their bobbing or dipping movements.

 American dipper, Cinclus mexicanus

DonacobiusOrder: PasseriformesFamily: Donacobiidae

The black-capped donacobius is found in wet habitats from Panama across northern South America and east of the Andes to Argentina and Paraguay.

 Black-capped donacobius, Donacobius atricapilla

Thrushes and alliesOrder: PasseriformesFamily: Turdidae

The thrushes are a group of passerine birds that occur mainly in the Old World. They are plump, soft plumaged, small to medium-sized insectivores or sometimes omnivores, often feeding on the ground. Many have attractive songs.

 Black-faced solitaire, Myadestes melanops
 Varied solitaire, Myadestes coloratus
 Black-billed nightingale-thrush, Catharus gracilirostris
 Orange-billed nightingale-thrush, Catharus aurantiirostris
 Slaty-backed nightingale-thrush, Catharus fuscater
 Ruddy-capped nightingale-thrush, Catharus frantzii
 Black-headed nightingale-thrush, Catharus mexicanus
 Veery, Catharus fuscescens
 Gray-cheeked thrush, Catharus minimus
 Swainson's thrush, Catharus ustulatus
 Wood thrush, Hylocichla mustelina (near-threatened)
 Sooty thrush, Turdus nigrescens
 Mountain thrush, Turdus plebejus
 Pale-vented thrush, Turdus obsoletus
 Clay-colored thrush, Turdus grayi
 White-throated thrush, Turdus assimilis

Old World flycatchersOrder: PasseriformesFamily: Muscicapidae

Old World flycatchers are a large group of small passerine birds native to the Old World. They are mainly small arboreal insectivores. The appearance of these birds is highly varied, but they mostly have weak songs and harsh calls.

 Northern wheatear, Oenanthe oenanthe (A)

Waxbills and alliesOrder: PasseriformesFamily: Estrildidae

The estrildid finches are small passerine birds of the Old World tropics and Australasia. They are gregarious and often colonial seed eaters with short thick but pointed bills. They are all similar in structure and habits, but have wide variation in plumage colors and patterns.

 Tricolored munia, Lonchura malacca (I) (A)

Old World sparrowsOrder: PasseriformesFamily: Passeridae

Sparrows are small passerine birds. In general, sparrows tend to be small, plump, brown or gray birds with short tails and short powerful beaks. Sparrows are seed eaters, but they also consume small insects.

 House sparrow, Passer domesticus (I)

Wagtails and pipitsOrder: PasseriformesFamily: Motacillidae

Motacillidae is a family of small passerine birds with medium to long tails. They include the wagtails, longclaws, and pipits. They are slender ground-feeding insectivores of open country.

 Yellowish pipit, Anthus chii

Finches, euphonias, and alliesOrder: PasseriformesFamily: Fringillidae

Finches are seed-eating passerine birds, that are small to moderately large and have a strong beak, usually conical and in some species very large. All have twelve tail feathers and nine primaries. These birds have a bouncing flight with alternating bouts of flapping and gliding on closed wings, and most sing well.

 Elegant euphonia, Chlorophonia elegantissima
 Yellow-collared chlorophonia, Chlorophonia flavirostris (A)
 Golden-browed chlorophonia, Chlorophonia callophrys
 Yellow-crowned euphonia, Euphonia luteicapilla
 White-vented euphonia, Euphonia minuta
 Yellow-throated euphonia, Euphonia hirundinacea (A)
 Thick-billed euphonia, Euphonia laniirostris
 Spot-crowned euphonia, Euphonia imitans
 Olive-backed euphonia, Euphonia gouldi
 Fulvous-vented euphonia, Euphonia fulvicrissa
 Tawny-capped euphonia, Euphonia anneae
 Orange-bellied euphonia, Euphonia xanthogaster
 Lesser goldfinch, Spinus psaltria
 Yellow-bellied siskin, Spinus xanthogastrus

Thrush-tanagerOrder: PasseriformesFamily: Rhodinocichlidae

This species was historically placed in family Thraupidae. It was placed in its own family in 2017.

 Rosy thrush-tanager, Rhodinocichla rosea

New World sparrowsOrder: PasseriformesFamily: Passerellidae

Until 2017, these species were considered part of the family Emberizidae. Most of the species are known as sparrows, but these birds are not closely related to the Old World sparrows which are in the family Passeridae. Many of these have distinctive head patterns.

 Yellow-throated chlorospingus, Chlorospingus flavigularis
 Ashy-throated chlorospingus, Chlorospingus canigularis
 Sooty-capped chlorospingus, Chlorospingus pileatus
 Common chlorospingus, Chlorospingus flavopectus
 Tacarcuna chlorospingus, Chlorospingus tacarcunae
 Pirre chlorospingus, Chlorospingus inornatus (E)
 Grasshopper sparrow, Ammodramus savannarum
 Black-striped sparrow, Arremonops conirostris
 Lark sparrow, Chondestes grammacus (A)
 Chipping sparrow, Spizella passerina (A)
 Clay-colored sparrow, Spizella pallida (A)
 Costa Rican brushfinch, Arremon costaricensis
 Black-headed brushfinch, Arremon atricapillus
 Orange-billed sparrow, Arremon aurantiirostris
 Chestnut-capped brushfinch, Arremon brunneinucha
 Sooty-faced finch, Lysurus crassirostris
 Volcano junco, Junco vulcani
 Rufous-collared sparrow, Zonotrichia capensis
 Lincoln's sparrow, Melospiza lincolnii (A)
 Large-footed finch, Pezopetes capitalis
 White-naped brushfinch, Atlapetes albinucha
 Yellow-thighed brushfinch, Atlapetes tibialis
 Yellow-green brushfinch, Atlapetes luteoviridis (E) (vulnerable)

WrenthrushOrder: PasseriformesFamily: Zeledoniidae

Despite its name, this species is neither a wren nor a thrush, and is not closely related to either family. It was moved from the wood-warblers (Parulidae) and placed in its own family in 2017.

 Wrenthrush, Zeledonia coronata

Yellow-breasted chatOrder: PasseriformesFamily: Icteriidae

This species was historically placed in the wood-warblers but nonetheless most authorities were unsure if it belonged there. It was placed in its own family in 2017.

 Yellow-breasted chat, Icteria virens (A)

Troupials and alliesOrder: PasseriformesFamily: Icteridae

The icterids are a group of small to medium-sized, often colorful, passerine birds restricted to the New World and include the grackles, New World blackbirds, and New World orioles. Most species have black as the predominant plumage color, often enlivened by yellow, orange, or red.

 Yellow-headed blackbird, Xanthocephalus xanthocephalus (A)
 Bobolink, Dolichonyx oryzivorus
 Eastern meadowlark, Sturnella magna (near-threatened)
 Red-breasted meadowlark, Leistes militaris
 Yellow-billed cacique, Amblycercus holosericeus
 Crested oropendola, Psarocolius decumanus
 Chestnut-headed oropendola, Psarocolius wagleri
 Montezuma oropendola, Psarocolius montezuma
 Black oropendola, Psarocolius guatimozinus
 Scarlet-rumped cacique, Cacicus uropygialis
 Yellow-rumped cacique, Cacicus cela
 Black-cowled oriole, Icterus prosthemelas
 Orchard oriole, Icterus spurius
 Yellow-backed oriole, Icterus chrysater
 Orange-crowned oriole, Icterus auricapillus
 Yellow-tailed oriole, Icterus mesomelas
 Baltimore oriole, Icterus galbula
 Red-winged blackbird, Agelaius phoeniceus (A)
 Shiny cowbird, Molothrus bonariensis
 Bronzed cowbird, Molothrus aeneus
 Brown-headed cowbird, Molothrus ater (A)
 Giant cowbird, Molothrus oryzivorus
 Melodious blackbird, Dives dives (A)`
 Great-tailed grackle, Quiscalus mexicanus
 Carib grackle, Quiscalus lugubris  (A)
 Yellow-hooded blackbird, Chrysomus icterocephalus (A)

New World warblersOrder: PasseriformesFamily: Parulidae

The wood-warblers are a group of small, often colorful, passerine birds restricted to the New World. Most are arboreal, but some are terrestrial. Most members of this family are insectivores.

 Ovenbird, Seiurus aurocapilla
 Worm-eating warbler, Helmitheros vermivorum
 Louisiana waterthrush, Parkesia motacilla
 Northern waterthrush, Parkesia noveboracensis
 Golden-winged warbler, Vermivora chrysoptera (near-threatened)
 Blue-winged warbler, Vermivora cyanoptera
 Black-and-white warbler, Mniotilta varia
 Prothonotary warbler, Protonotaria citrea
 Swainson's warbler, Limnothlypis swainsonii (A)
 Flame-throated warbler, Leiothlypis gutturalis
 Tennessee warbler, Leiothlypis peregrina
 Orange-crowned warbler, Leiothlypis celata (A)
 Nashville warbler, Leiothlypis ruficapilla (A)
 Virginia's warbler, Oreothlypis virginiae (A)
 Connecticut warbler, Leiothlypis agilis (A)
 Gray-crowned yellowthroat, Geothlypis poliocephala
 Masked yellowthroat, Geothlypis aequinoctialis (A)
 MacGillivray's warbler, Geothlypis tolmiei (A)
 Mourning warbler, Geothlypis philadelphia
 Kentucky warbler, Geothlypis formosa
 Olive-crowned yellowthroat, Geothlypis semiflava
 Common yellowthroat, Geothlypis trichas (A)
 Hooded warbler, Setophaga citrina
 American redstart, Setophaga ruticilla
 Cape May warbler, Setophaga tigrina
 Cerulean warbler, Setophaga cerulea (near-threatened)
 Northern parula, Setophaga americana (A)
 Tropical parula, Setophaga pitiayumi
 Magnolia warbler, Setophaga magnolia
 Bay-breasted warbler, Setophaga castanea
 Blackburnian warbler, Setophaga fusca
 Yellow warbler, Setophaga petechia
 Chestnut-sided warbler, Setophaga pensylvanica
 Blackpoll warbler, Setophaga striata (A) (near-threatened)
 Black-throated blue warbler, Setophaga caerulescens (A)
 Palm warbler, Setophaga palmarum
 Yellow-rumped warbler, Setophaga coronata
 Yellow-throated warbler, Setophaga dominica (A)
 Prairie warbler, Setophaga discolor (A)
 Townsend's warbler, Setophaga townsendi (A)
 Hermit warbler, Setophaga occidentalis (A)
 Golden-cheeked warbler, Setophaga chrysoparia (A) (endangered)
 Black-throated green warbler, Setophaga virens
 Buff-rumped warbler, Myiothlypis fulvicauda
 Chestnut-capped warbler, Basileuterus delattrii
 Black-cheeked warbler, Basileuterus melanogenys
 Pirre warbler, Basileuterus ignotus (vulnerable)
 Golden-crowned warbler, Basileuterus culicivorus
 Costa Rican warbler, Basileuterus melanotis
 Tacarcuna warbler, Basileuterus tacarcunae
 Canada warbler, Cardellina canadensis
 Wilson's warbler, Cardellina pusilla
 Slate-throated redstart, Myioborus miniatus
 Collared redstart, Myioborus torquatus

Mitrospingid tanagersOrder: PasseriformesFamily: Mitrospingidae

The members of this small family were previously included in Thraupidae ("true" tanagers). They were placed in this new family in 2017.

 Dusky-faced tanager, Mitrospingus cassinii

Cardinals and alliesOrder: PasseriformesFamily: Cardinalidae

The cardinals are a family of robust, seed-eating birds with strong bills. They are typically associated with open woodland. The sexes usually have distinct plumages.

 Hepatic tanager, Piranga flava
 Summer tanager, Piranga rubra
 Scarlet tanager, Piranga olivacea
 Western tanager, Piranga ludoviciana
 Flame-colored tanager, Piranga bidentata
 White-winged tanager, Piranga leucoptera
 Red-crowned ant-tanager, Habia rubica
 Red-throated ant-tanager, Habia fuscicauda
 Carmiol's tanager, Chlorothraupis carmioli
 Lemon-spectacled tanager, Chlorothraupis olivacea
 Black-faced grosbeak, Caryothraustes poliogaster
 Yellow-green grosbeak, Caryothraustes canadensis
 Black-thighed grosbeak, Pheucticus tibialis
 Rose-breasted grosbeak, Pheucticus ludovicianus
 Blue seedeater, Amaurospiza concolor
 Blue-black grosbeak, Cyanoloxia cyanoides
 Blue grosbeak, Passerina caerulea
 Indigo bunting, Passerina cyanea
 Painted bunting, Passerina ciris (near-threatened)
 Dickcissel, Spiza americana

Tanagers and alliesOrder: PasseriformesFamily''': Thraupidae

The tanagers are a large group of small to medium-sized passerine birds restricted to the New World, mainly in the tropics. Many species are brightly colored. As a family they are omnivorous, but individual species specialize in eating fruits, seeds, insects, or other types of food. Most have short, rounded wings.

 Hooded tanager, Nemosia pileata (A)
 Blue-and-gold tanager, Bangsia arcaei (near-threatened)
 Speckled tanager, Ixothraupis guttata Gray-and-gold tanager, Poecilostreptus palmeri Golden-hooded tanager, Stilpnia larvata Blue-gray tanager, Thraupis episcopus Palm tanager, Thraupis palmarum Green-naped tanager, Tangara fucosa (near-threatened)
 Spangle-cheeked tanager, Tangara dowii Plain-colored tanager, Tangara inornata Rufous-winged tanager, Tangara lavinia Bay-headed tanager, Tangara gyrola Emerald tanager, Tangara florida Silver-throated tanager, Tangara icterocephala White-eared conebill, Conirostrum leucogenys Saffron finch, Sicalis flaveola (I)
 Grassland yellow-finch, Sicalis luteola Slaty finch, Haplospiza rustica Peg-billed finch, Acanthidops bairdi Slaty flowerpiercer, Diglossa plumbea Green honeycreeper, Chlorophanes spiza Black-and-yellow tanager, Chrysothlypis chrysomelas Sulphur-rumped tanager, Heterospingus rubrifrons Scarlet-browed tanager, Heterospingus xanthopygius Yellow-backed tanager, Hemithraupis flavicollis Blue-black grassquit, Volatinia jacarina Gray-headed tanager, Eucometis penicillata White-shouldered tanager, Loriotus luctuosus Tawny-crested tanager, Tachyphonus delatrii White-lined tanager, Tachyphonus rufus White-throated shrike-tanager, Lanio leucothorax Crimson-collared tanager, Ramphocelus sanguinolentus Flame-rumped tanager, Ramphocelus flammigerus Scarlet-rumped tanager, Ramphocelus passerinii Crimson-backed tanager, Ramphocelus dimidiatus Swallow tanager, Tersina viridis Shining honeycreeper, Cyanerpes lucidus Purple honeycreeper, Cyanerpes caeruleus Red-legged honeycreeper, Cyanerpes cyaneus Scarlet-thighed dacnis, Dacnis venusta Blue dacnis, Dacnis cayana Viridian dacnis, Dacnis viguieri (near-threatened)
 Bananaquit, Coereba flaveola Yellow-faced grassquit, Tiaris olivaceus Lesson's seedeater, Sporophila bouvronides (A)
 Lined seedeater, Sporophila lineola (A)
 Thick-billed seed-finch, Sporophila funerea Large-billed seed-finch, Sporophila crassirostris Nicaraguan seed-finch, Sporophila nuttingi Variable seedeater, Sporophila corvina Slate-colored seedeater, Sporophila schistacea Morelet's seedeater, Sporophila morelleti Yellow-bellied seedeater, Sporophila nigricollis Ruddy-breasted seedeater, Sporophila minuta Wedge-tailed grass-finch, Emberizoides herbicola Black-headed saltator, Saltator atriceps Olivaceous saltator, Saltator olivascens (A)
 Buff-throated saltator, Saltator maximus Slate-colored grosbeak, Saltator grossus Cinnamon-bellied saltator, Saltator grandis Blue-gray saltator, Saltator coerulescens Streaked saltator, Saltator striatipectus''

References

See also
 List of birds
 Lists of birds by region

External links
Birds of Panama - World Institute for Conservation and Environment

Panama

Birds of Panama